Ernest Albert Ashton (7 July 1883 – 1 August 1955) was an Australian rules footballer who played with Carlton in the Victorian Football League (VFL).

Notes

External links 

 
Ernie Ashton's profile at Blueseum

1883 births
1955 deaths
Australian rules footballers from Victoria (Australia)
Carlton Football Club (VFA) players
Carlton Football Club players